The Province of Lapland was a province of Finland from 1938 to 2009.

It was established in 1938, when it was separated from the Province of Oulu. After the Second World War, the Petsamo municipality (former province) and part of the Salla municipality were ceded to the Soviet Union.

It had the same territory as today's region Lapland (Finland).

Maps

Administration 
The State Provincial Office was a joint regional authority of seven different ministries. It promoted national and regional objectives of the State central administration.

Regions 
The province of Lapland was reorganized into one region: 
Lapland (Lappi / Lappland)

Municipalities in 2009 (cities in bold) 

Enontekiö
Inari
Kemi
Kemijärvi
Keminmaa
Kittilä
Kolari
Muonio
Pelkosenniemi
Pello
Posio
Ranua
Rovaniemi
Salla
Savukoski
Simo
Sodankylä
Tervola
Tornio
Utsjoki
Ylitornio

Former municipalities (disestablished before 2009) 
 Alatornio
 Karunki
 Kemijärven mlk
 Petsamo 
 Rovaniemen mlk

Governors 
 Kaarlo Hillilä 1938–1947
 Uuno Hannula 1947–1958
 Martti Miettunen 1958–1973
 Asko Oinas 1974–1994
 Hannele Pokka 1994–2008
 Timo E. Korva 2008–2009

Provinces of Finland (1917–97)
Provinces of Finland (1997–2009)
Lapland (Finland)